The 2013 National Premier Soccer League season was the 101st season of FIFA-sanctioned soccer in the United States, and the 11th season of the NPSL. The season began in May 2013. FC Sonic Lehigh Valley were the defending champions, having won their first NPSL title the previous season. The league held their Annual General Managers meeting (AGM) during the weekend of the NASL Soccer Bowl in Atlanta in November.

Format

Summary of Regions and Conferences

Changes from 2012
The following changes regarding team relocation, rebranding, or expansion are effective for the 2013 NPSL season:

Return from Hiatus

New Teams

Withdrew

Standings
As of 7/14/13

Northeast Region

Atlantic Division

Keystone Conference
Play-offs structure determined by Winning percentage (PCT) instead of Points (P)

South Region

Mid-Atlantic Division

Southeast Division

Sunshine Division

South Central Division

Midwest Region

Central Division

Great Lakes Division

West Region

Southern Division

Northern Division

Playoffs

Format
Northeast Region
The top two finishers in the Keystone and Atlantic Divisions play in a crossover playoff.
 
South Region
Each Division Champion

Midwest Region - Great Lakes Division
Top four teams are playing in a playoff tournament.

Midwest Region
Central Division Champion and Great Lakes Division playoff tournament winner.

West Region
The top two finishers in the Northern and Southern Divisions play in a crossover playoff.

Northeast Region

South Region

Midwest-Great Lakes Playoffs

Midwest Region Final

West Region

NPSL Championship

Semi-finals

NPSL Championship Game

References

 
2013
4